Daryl Karolat (born December 8, 1966) is a Canadian actor and retired professional wrestler, better known by the name Tyler Mane. He is known for playing Sabretooth in X-Men, Ajax in Troy, and Michael Myers in the remake of Halloween and its sequel Halloween II. He appeared as supervillain Blackstar in the 2021 Netflix limited series Jupiter's Legacy.

Professional wrestling career
Born and raised in Saskatoon, Saskatchewan he graduated from City Park Collegiate Institute.
As a teenager, Karolat travelled to Calgary, where he trained briefly with Stu Hart. He later began training with Red Bastien in 1986, and completed further training with Mando Guerrero. Mane began his career in 1986 under the name "Skywalker Nitron" in his native Canada. In 1987 he wrestled as Skyhigh Lee in Pacific Northwest Wrestling (Portland), billed from California. 

In 1987, he wrestled in South Africa, which resulted in an invitation to wrestle for Joint Promotions in the United Kingdom, where he arrived in November. Billed as "'Sky' Walker" he appeared in one match on ITV, a disqualification loss to Pat Roach. His furious reaction to the referee's decision was later incorporated into the standalone wrestling show's title sequence.  

The following year, he toured New Japan Pro-Wrestling as "Gully Gaspar", alongside Billy and Barry as a bunch of hockey-masked pirates managed by KY Wakamatsu. He could also be seen in WCW occasionally as the bodyguard of the tag team Doom along with Woman late in 1989, specifically Starrcade 1989.

In 1990, Karolat began wrestling in Puerto Rico and toured with All Japan Pro Wrestling, where he participated in the World's Strongest Tag Determination League. He then joined the Mexican promotion Consejo Mundial de Lucha Libre.

In 1993, he signed with World Championship Wrestling, under the name "Big Sky" and teamed with Vinnie Vegas. After Vegas left WCW to become Diesel in the WWF, Mane was left in limbo and left WCW by the end of the year. In 1994, he joined Herb Abrams' Universal Wrestling Federation and became the only UWF MGM Grand Champion, defeating Steve Ray to win the vacant title. After Abrams' death and eventual dissolving of the UWF in 1996, Mane retired.

Film and television career
In 1992, during his time within Mexico with Consejo Mundial de Lucha Libre, Mane made his film debut in Luchadores de las Estrellas playing the villain of the movie, El Vampiro Interespacial. While part of WCW, he auditioned for and received a part in the television series Smokey and the Bandit.

After retiring from wrestling, he appeared in numerous films, including X-Men as Sabretooth, How to Make a Monster as Hardcore, Joe Dirt, The Scorpion King, Troy as Ajax, Hercules as Antaeus, and The Devil's Rejects in the uncredited role of Rufus. The role of Sabretooth was initially intended for Kevin Nash (Mane's former wrestling tag team partner) but was awarded to Mane due to Nash's scheduling conflicts.

In 2007, he played Michael Myers in Rob Zombie's remake of Halloween. After winning the role, he noted that he consecutively watched seven of the eight Halloween films (excluding the third because Michael Myers does not appear) to better understand his character. He is the tallest actor (6' 8") to portray the character. In 2009, he reprised the role again in Rob Zombie's H2, being only the second actor to play Michael Myers more than once, and the first actor to play the role in consecutive films.

In 2010, he and his wife launched their own production company: Mane Entertainment. Their first feature, Compound Fracture, was released in 2013.

In 2016, Tyler co-starred in Fuzz on the Lens Productions comedy/fantasy film Abnormal Attraction, reuniting with Malcolm McDowell (Halloween), Leslie Easterbrook (Compound Fracture) and his wife Renae Geerlings.

In 2019 Mane co-starred in the comedy Playing with Fire alongside fellow professional wrestler John Cena.

Personal life
Mane was previously married to Jean Goertz from 1988 to 2003. He married actress Renae Geerlings in 2007.

Filmography

Film

Television

Video games

Music videos

Championships and accomplishments
All Japan Pro Wrestling
World's Strongest Tag Determination League New Wave Award (1990) - with Butch Masters
Pro Wrestling Illustrated
PWI ranked him #440 of the 500 best singles wrestlers of the year in the PWI 500 in 1991
Universal Wrestling Federation
UWF MGM Grand Championship (1 time)

References

External links
TylerMane.com
Online World of Wrestling Profile

1966 births
Canadian male film actors
Canadian male television actors
Canadian male voice actors
Canadian male professional wrestlers
Living people
Male actors from Saskatoon
Professional wrestlers from Saskatchewan
Sportspeople from Saskatoon